Antônio de Carvalho Barbosa (born 25 August 1948), known professionally as Tony Ramos, is a Brazilian actor.

Ramos has played leading roles in major telenovela productions for more than four decades.  Many of his most famous roles share the characteristics of honesty and morality.  Many of Ramos' more recent starring roles in novelas have cast him playing non-Brazilians, including the Greek Nikos in Belíssima (2005), the American Percival Farquhar in Mad Maria (2005), the Indian Opash in Caminho das Índias (2009), and the Italian Antonio Mattoli in Passione (2010). Ramos is fluent in English, French and Spanish, and has some knowledge of Italian.  Ramos' acting process does not involve internalizing the character's emotions; instead, he creates his characters using external technique.

Biography
Ramos was born in Arapongas, Paraná, the son of Maria Antonia Barbosa, a teacher. He spent his youth in the city of Avaré, in the country side of the Brazilian state São Paulo. Since he was a child, he expressed interest in acting and theater, drawing inspiration from Oscarito's films. Already in São Paulo, he made amateur theater while participating in the Teatro Cultura de São Paulo, where he staged plays for children. He holds a degree in Philosophy from the Pontifical Catholic University of São Paulo.

Career 
Ramos is one of the most important actors in Brazil, especially known for his work in telenovelas.  His use of an Anglicized first name was common at the time he began his acting career, and the name Ramos is the last name of a relative.  Ramos was born in the country side of Paraná and spent his youth in Ourinhos in the country side of the state of São Paulo.  As a boy, he dreamed of being an actor.  When young Ramos watched the films of Oscarito (a Brazilian film comedian who made dozens of films in the 1940s, 1950s and 1960s), he wanted to be like him.   Later, while living in São Paulo, he performed in amateur theater with the Teatro Cultura Artística de São Paulo (Theater of Artistic Culture of São Paulo).  At 16 years old, he was part of the musical team “Tony e Tom & Jerry” that made an appearance on the TV show Jovem Guarda (Young Guard).

In 1964, he made his debut as an actor on television, appearing in skits on the program Novos em Foco (Youth in Focus), on the channel TV Tupi.  The show served as a testing ground for rising young actors, and after signing with TV Tupi, he participated in TV de Vanguarda (TV of the Vanguard), TV de Comédia (Comedy TV) and Grande Teatro Tupi (Tupi Great Theater). In 1965, Ramos appeared in his first novela, A Outra. (The Other).

While at TV Tupi,  he appeared in various other productions, among them: Antônio Maria (1968) the novela that gave his career a major boost; Simplesmente Maria (Simply Maria, 1970), in which he played his first major role (Toninho); Vitória Bonelli (1972), as co-star with Tiago Bonelli; Rosa dos Ventos (Rose of the Winds, 1973), his first role as male lead in a novela (Quico); Ídolo de Pano (Idol of Rags, 1974), as the protagonist Luciano; and A Viagem  (The Voyage, 1975), as the co-lead Téo.

In 1977, Ramos moved to Rede Globo (the TV network Globo), at the same time moving to Rio de Janeiro.  At Rede Globo, he consolidated his success.  His first performance for the network was in the novela Espelho Mágico (Magic Mirror).  In the same year, he shared duties as host of the musical program Globo de Ouro (Globe of Gold) with the actress Christiane Torloni.  By the end of the year he was starring in the novela O Astro (The Star), in which he took his first lead role at Rede Globo.  During the novela, Ramos appeared in the first male nude scene in Brazilian novelas,  despite the censorship of the military dictatorship in power at the time.

In 1979, he starred in the novela Pai Herói (Hero Dad).  Afterwards, he joined the cast of the novela Chega Mais (More Comes) in the role of the grifter Tom, who despite the dubious nature of the character was the protagonist of the novela, beside Gelly, played by Sônia Braga.  In 1981, he acted for the first time in a novela written by Manoel Carlos, playing the twins João Victor and Quinzinho in the novela Baila Comigo (Dance with Me).  His performance, in which he distinguished the two characters without resort to makeup, using techniques of voice and posture to define the characters, was acclaimed by the critics.  Later, he co-starred in the novela Sol de Verão (Summer Sun), in a sensitive portrayal of the deaf-mute Abel.  In the novela Champagne, he played the son of a humble waiter, who had to fight to prove his father innocent of a false accusation of murder.

He began a sequence of lead roles in novelas, among them the mysterious Pardel in the novela Livre para Voar (Free to Fly), the hitman Riobaldo in the historical novela Grande Sertão: Veredas (Tracks in the Great Wilderness), the ambitious Cristiano in the remake of Selva de Pedra (Jungle of Stone), the muddled taxidriver Tonico in Bebê a Bordo (Baby on Board), the engineer Jorge in the miniseries O Primo Basílio (Cousin Basílio), the bankrupt millionaire Edu in Rainha da Sucata (Queen of Trash), the biologist João in the miniseries O Sorriso do Lagarto (The Lizard’s Smile), and the lawyer Álvaro in Felicidade (Happiness).

In 1993, he hosted some episodes of Você Decide (You Decide) while also participating in the novela Olho no Olho (Eye to Eye), in the role of Father Guido, who leaves the priesthood to fight a crime syndicate.  In 1994,he participated in the pilot of the series A Comédia da Vida Privada (The Comedy of Private Life).  In 1995, he starred in the novela A Próxima Vítima (The Next Victim).  The next year he returned to host Você Decide, in addition to joining the regular cast of the series A Vida Como Ela É (A life Like This Is) and starred in the novela Anjo de Mim (My Angel).

In 1998, he was featured as one of the principal characters of the novela Torre de Babel (Tower of Babel) as the ex-con Clementino, who begins the novela in prison for having murdered his wife after discovering that she was cheating on him, and who afterwards rehabilitates himself with the help of a new love.  Next, he played the romantic bookseller Miguel in Laços de Família (Family Ties).  In As Filhas da Mãe (Mother’s Children) he played the Spaniard Manolo Gutierrez, owner of a casino.

In 2003, he played the musician Teo in the novela Mulheres Apaixonadas (Women in Love).  Next, he co-starred in the remake of Cabocla (Mestiza), as Colonel Boanerges, and in 2005 worked in the miniseries Mad Maria, as the American impresario Percival Farquhar, and in the novela Belíssima (Beautiful), in which he played the Greek Nikos.

In 2007, he played impresario Antenor Cavalcanti in the novela Paraíso Tropical (Tropical Paradise), a complex character of soaring ambition who cannot bring himself to become a villain.  In 2009, he was in the featured cast of the award-winning novela Caminho das Índias (The Way of India; also known as India – A Love Story), as the Indian Opash Ananda.  In 2010, he starred as the Italian farmer Totó in the novela Passione (Passion),  a role in which he blended Italian vocabulary into his speech for additional verisimilitude.   The creator of the novela, Silvio de Abreu, wrote the role especially for him.   In 2012 he appeared in a brief but pivotal role in the novela Avenida Brasil.

In addition to novelas, Ramos acted in more than 80 television movies and more than twenty plays.  His debut in the theater came in 1969, with the play Quando as Máquinas Param (When the Machines Stop), with Walderez de Barros.  In the same year he appeared in Rapazes da Banda (The Boys in the Band) and in 1971, he appeared in Pequenos Assassinatos (Little Victims). In 1989 he appeared in the musical Meu Refrão Olê Olá (My Refrain Olê Olá), in homage to the 25 year career of the songwriter Chico Buarque, in which he played the transvestite Geni, and in 1997 he acted in the play Cenas de um Casamento (Scenes from a Wedding) in which he played opposite Regina Braga. Finally, in 2002 he played an ex-torturer police officer in the play Novas Diretrizes em Tempos de Paz (New Directors in Times of Peace).

Ramos starred in the movie O Pequeno Mundo de Marcos (The Little World of Marcos) in 1968.   Among other film productions, he acted in Leila Diniz, as the father of the title role actress.  He won the best actor award at the Festival de Gramado for his role in Bufo & Spallanzani. One of his great box-office successes was Se Eu Fosse Você (If I Were You) e Se Eu Fosse Você 2.

On May 7, 2009, Ramos received the medal of the Ordem de Rio Branco (Order of Rio Branco) from the Ministry of Foreign Relations in recognition of his work in cinema, theater, and television.  The award ceremony took place at the Palácio do Itamaraty (Itamaraty Palace), in Brasília, in which Brazilian president Luiz Inácio Lula da Silva (Lula) the first lady Marisa Letícia, and the minister for Foreign Relations Celso Amorim participated.

Personal life

Ramos is considered by his professional colleagues to be a person of integrity and good humor.  In addition, he has one of the most stable marriages in the artistic community of Brazil: he married his wife Lidiane Barbosa in 1969. They have two children: Rodrigo, a doctor, and Andréa, a lawyer. Ramos is a practising Roman Catholic.

Filmography

Television
 1965 - A Outra.... Vevé
 1966 - O Amor Tem Cara de Mulher
 1967 - Os Rebeldes .... Frank Sobrinho
 1968 - Os Amores de Bob .... Bob
 1968 - Antônio Maria.... Gustavo
 1969 - Nino, o Italianinho.... Rubinho
 1970 - Simplesmente Maria.... Toninho
 1970 - As Bruxas.... Tito
 1971 - Hospital.... Luís Carlos
 1972 - A Revolta dos Anjos
 1972 - Na Idade do Lobo
 1972 - Vitória Bonelli.... Tiago Bonelli
 1973 - Rosa dos Ventos.... Quico
 1974 - Ídolo de Pano.... Luciano
 1974 - Os Inocentes.... Marcelo
 1975 - A Viagem.... Téo
 1976 - O Julgamento.... Lico
 1976 - Ano Internacional da Criança .... Apresentador
 1977 - Espelho Mágico.... Paulo Morel/Cristiano
 1977 - O Astro.... Márcio Hayala
 1978 - Caso Especial, O Caminho das Pedras Verdes
 1979 - Pai Herói.... André Cajarana
 1980 - Chega Mais.... Tom
 1981 - Show do Mês .... Apresentador
 1981 - Baila Comigo.... João Victor Gama/Quinzinho
 1982 - Caso Verdade, O Menino do Olho Azul ....
 1982 - Elas por Elas
 1982 - Sol de Verão.... Abel
 1983 - Champagne.... Nil
 1984 - Livre para Voar.... Pardal
 1985 - Grande Sertão: Veredas .... Riobaldo
 1986 - Selva de Pedra.... Cristiano Vilhena
 1988 - O Primo Basílio .... Jorge Carvalho
 1988 - Bebê a Bordo.... Tonico Ladeira
 1990 - Boca do Lixo
 1990 - Rainha da Sucata.... Edu
 1991 - O Sorriso do Lagarto .... João Pedroso
 1991 - Felicidade.... Álvaro Peixoto
 1993 - Você Decide .... Apresentador
 1993 - Olho no Olho.... Padre Guido
 1993 - O Mapa da Mina
 1995 - A Próxima Vítima.... Juca Mestieri
 1995 - Não Fuja da Raia
 1996 - Você Decide .... Apresentador
 1996 - Anjo de Mim.... Floriano Ferraz
 1996 - A Vida como Ela É .... Várias Personagens
 1998 - Você Decide, Desencontro
 1998 - Torre de Babel.... José Clementino da Silva
 1999 - Sai de Baixo, Novela da Vida Privada
 2000 - Laços de Família.... Miguel Soriano
 2001 - Sítio do Picapau Amarelo, A Festa da Cuca
 2001 - As Filhas da Mãe.... Manolo Gutiérrez
 2002 - O Clone.... Namorado de Maysa (special participation)
 2003 - Mulheres Apaixonadas.... Teófilo "Téo" Ribeiro Alves
 2004 - Cabocla.... Coronel Boanerges de Sousa Pereira
 2005 - Mad Maria .... Percival Farquhar
 2005 - Belíssima.... Nikolaos "Nikos" Petrákis
 2007 - Paraíso Tropical .... Antenor Cavalcanti
 2008 - Faça Sua História, Robauto S.A. .... Passageiro
 2009 - India – A Love Story .... Opash Ananda
 2010 - Passione .... Antonio "Totó" Mattoli
 2011 - Chico Xavier .... Orlando
 2012 - Avenida Brasil .... Genésio (special participation) 
 2012 - Guerra dos Sexos .... Otávio de Alcântara Rodrigues e Silva (Otávio II/Bimbinho/Dominguinhos)
 2015 - A Regra do Jogo .... José Maria "Zé Maria" Pereira 
 2016 - A Lei do Amor .... Senator Roberval Mendes (special participation)
 2019 - Verão 90 .... Figueirinha's voice

Cinema 
 1968 - O Pequeno Mundo de Marcos.... Tony
 1971 - Diabólicos Herdeiros
 1976 - Ninguém Segura Essas Mulheres.... Gugu
 1984 - Noites do Sertão.... Miguel
 1987 - Leila Diniz.... sr. Diniz
 1989 - Minas-Texas
 1997 - O Noviço Rebelde.... Dr. Filipe
 1997 - Pequeno Dicionário Amoroso.... Barata
 2001 - A Partilha
 2001 - Bufo & Spallanzani.... Guedes
 2002 - Era Uma Vez... no Brasil
 2006 - If I Were You.... Cláudio/Helena
 2008 - If I Were You 2.... Cláudio/Helena
 2009 - Tempos de Paz.... Segismundo
 2010 - Chico Xavier .... Orlando
 2012 - Se eu fosse Você 3 .... Cláudio/Helena
 2014 - Getúlio .... Getúlio Vargas

Theater 
 Quando as máquinas Param
 Rapazes da Banda
 Pequenos Assassinatos
 Meu Refrão: Olê, Olá
 O Pagador de Promessas
 A Morte e a Donzela
 Cenas de um Casamento
 Novas Diretrizes em Tempos de Paz

References

External links
 Tony Ramos (in Portuguese) at Memória Globo

1948 births
Living people
People from Arapongas
Brazilian people of Portuguese descent
Brazilian male film actors
Brazilian male telenovela actors
Brazilian male stage actors
Brazilian Roman Catholics